The 1960 Pacific hurricane season was an event in the annual seasons of Tropical Cyclone development. It officially started on May 15, 1960, in the eastern Pacific and lasted until November 30, 1960. The 1960 season was the first season that Eastern Pacific hurricanes were named.

Eight tropical cyclones, seven named storms and five hurricanes formed during the 1960 season, none of the hurricanes reached beyond category 1 status on the Saffir-Simpson Hurricane Scale.

Systems

Tropical Storm Annette

Tropical Storm Annette formed on June 9 as a 45 mph (70 km/h) tropical storm south of Mexico and moved westward before dissipating on June 12. The storm never made landfall and the effects from Annette is unknown.

Tropical Storm Bonny

Tropical Storm Bonny formed on June 22 southwest of Mexico and moved northwestward as a 45 mph (70 km/h) tropical storm. Bonny then turned northward and then turned westward before dissipating south of Baja California on June 26.

Hurricane Celeste

The remnants of Hurricane Abby crossed over Mexico into the Pacific Ocean and regenerated into a hurricane on July 20 and was named Celeste. The hurricane moved northwestward where it winds peaked at 85 mph (135 km/h) before it weakened into a tropical storm and dissipated on July 22.

Hurricane Diana

Hurricane Diana formed on August 16 And reached hurricane strength on August 17 where it moved northwestward. Diana briefly weakened into a tropical storm on August 18 before reaching hurricane strength again the following day. After brushing southern Baja California Peninsula, Diana entered the Gulf of California where it became extratropical on August 20.

Hurricane Estelle

Estelle formed on August 29 south-southwest of Guatemala. The storm moved west-northwest, paralleling the coast of Mexico as an 85 mph (135 km/h) hurricane before becoming extratropical on September 9. The remnants of Estelle brought heavy rainfall across southern California with rainfall totals reaching 3.1 inches (76.2 mm) in Julian.

Hurricane Fernanda 

Fernanda formed on September 3 southwest of Guatemala where it moved west-northwest as a category 1 hurricane before dissipating on September 8 southwest of Mexico.

Hurricane Gwen

Only one report of Gwen was submitted to the National Weather Bureau by the vessel Lord Lodrington early on October 4. The system was given the name Gwen and an Air Force reconnaissance aircraft sent to monitor the system. However, by the time they reached the area where the hurricane was positioned, found the storm had completely dissipated. Due to the lack of reports no track data was produced for Gwen.

Hurricane Hyacinth

Hyacinth formed as a hurricane on October 21 and recurved northeastward where it made weakened into a tropical storm before it made landfall as a tropical depression on October 23. Damage from Hyacinth, if any, is unknown.

Storm names
The following names were used for named storms that formed in the eastern Pacific in 1960. No names were retired, so it was used again in the 1968 season. This is the first time this list was used. Names that were not assigned are marked in gray.

The Central Pacific used names and numbers from the Western Pacific's typhoon list. No systems formed in the area, and thus no names were required.

See also 

 Tropical cyclone
 List of Pacific hurricanes
 1960 Atlantic hurricane season
 1960 Pacific typhoon season
 1960 North Indian Ocean cyclone season
 Australian region cyclone seasons: 1959–60 1960–61
 South Pacific cyclone seasons: 1959–60 1960–61
 South-West Indian Ocean cyclone seasons: 1959–60 1960–61

References

 
Pacific hurricane seasons
Articles which contain graphical timelines